The Arcadia Invitational is a high school track and field meet in the United States. It is considered the most competitive meet in the country and has been billed as the "Home of National Records". The meet is held at Arcadia High School in Arcadia, California, on either the first or second weekend in April each year.  The Arcadia Invitational attracts the top prep athletes in the United States and internationally (Canada, Mexico, Australia, Ireland, New Zealand, Argentina, and Brazil have been represented in recent years).  The Arcadia Invitational has played host to  32 national high school records and has helped to produce 179 U.S. Olympians.

History
In 1968, Arcadia High School track coach Doug Smith had an idea for an evening track and field meet for all the area schools. The first invitational was held more than 50 years ago, with 23 schools and six track clubs participating. Arcadia graduate Tracy Smith was the first of many future Olympic athletes to be a winner in the Arcadia Invitational. He went on to participate in the 1968 Mexico City Olympics. 1970 is the year that Doug Smith felt was a giant step in the development of the meet into more of a "Southern California" event. Santa Ana  Coach Earl Engman, who was the Meet Director of the CIF-Southern Section championship affairs, entered his championship squad from Orange County, enhancing the event with the members of his top program from the greater San Gabriel Valley.

The invitational has since gone on to produce 32 U.S. high school records and 179 U.S. Olympians up to and including the 2016 U.S. Olympic Trials.

In 2002, the meet expanded from a single-day competition to a two-day affair as the newly formed Friday portion consisted of additional relays (sprint medleys, shuttle hurdles, 4x800, etc.) not common at most meets. In 2004, another (third) section of field events competition also was added to the Friday schedule.

In 2008, the Arcadia Multis were added on the Thursday-Friday of meet week, allowing top decathletes and heptathletes the chance to compete. It has become the premier multi-events competition for high schoolers, with both national decathlon records (high school implements and international implements) for boys achieved there. In 2010, the deepest quality field of high school heptathletes was featured.

The Arcadia Invitational is now among the largest outdoor high school meets in the United States, with more than 4,000 high school athletes competing. In terms of participation numbers, it is also the largest high school sporting event in the nation that is hosted on a high school campus.

3200 meters
Amongst all the high-quality performers featured annually, the boys' 3200-meter event has become a signature event for inspiring top performances.  The competitive environment and ideal weather allows many elite male athletes to break the 9-minute barrier for the first time. At the 2017 meet, an unprecedented 27 athletes broke 9 minutes (25 in the invitational section and 2 in the seeded section).

Notable athletes 

Jordan Hasay
Noah Lyles
Will Claye
Curtis Beach
Sondre Guttormsen
Jahvid Best
Alysia Montano
Quincy Watts
Chaunte Lowe
Steve Lewis
Stephanie Brown-Trafton
Danny Everett
Amy Acuff
Carmelita Jeter
Ashton Eaton
Valerie Brisco-Hooks
Gail Devers
Bryshon Nellum
Jillian Camarena-Williams
Mike Powell
Shannon Rowbury
Michael Marsh
Marion Jones
Meb Keflezighi

Allyson Felix
Monique Henderson
Ryan Hall
Lashinda Demus
Kyle Alcorn
Sydney McLaughlin
Deena Kastor
Jamie Nieto
Michelle Perry
Alan Webb
Cathy Freeman, Australia
Steve Smith
Jessica Cosby
Aretha Thurmond
Sharon Day
Chris Derrick

Meet records

Boys

Girls

References

External links

 Arcadia Invitational Website
 Arcadia Invitational records after 2017 edition
 DyeStat Feature Page
 RunnerSpace Arcadia Media Page, See all Races

College track and field competitions in the United States
High school track and field competitions in the United States
Track and field in California
Annual track and field meetings
High school sports in California
Arcadia, California